Reginald Eugene Haynes (born September 15, 1954) is a former American football tight end in the National Football League for the Washington Redskins.  He played college football at the University of Nevada, Las Vegas and was drafted in the seventh round of the 1977 NFL Draft.

1954 births
Living people
American football tight ends
Washington Redskins players
People from Denison, Texas